Jerome Beale was  Master of Pembroke from 1619 to 1630; and Vice-Chancellor of the University of Cambridge in 1622 to 1623.

Beale was born in Worcestershire. He graduated B.A. from  Christ's College, Cambridge in 1596; M.A. from Pembroke College, Cambridge in 1599;  B.D. in 1607 and D.D. in 1619. He held livings at Cowfold, West Wittering, Nuthurst, Hardwicke and Willingham.

Beale cited and defended the Dutch Arminian literature. He held Arminian views.

Notes and references

Citations

Sources

External links

1630 deaths
17th-century English Anglican priests
Alumni of Christ's College, Cambridge
Arminian ministers
Arminian writers
Fellows of Pembroke College, Cambridge
Masters of Pembroke College, Cambridge
People from Worcestershire
Vice-Chancellors of the University of Cambridge